Sara de Ibáñez (1909–1971) was an Uruguayan poet, literary critic, and educator.

Biography
Ibáñez was born in Chamberlain. She was known for her "intensely lyrical poetry on topics of universal importance", such as war, the apocalypse, death, nature, and love. She employed traditional verse forms, like the sonnet, along with freer verse forms.

Ibáñez died in Montevideo in 1971.

Works
 Canto a Montevideo [Song to Montevideo]. 1941.
 Pastoral. México: Cuadernos americanos, 1948.
 Artigas. 1952.
 Las estaciones y otros poemas [The seasons and other poems]. México: Tezontle, 1957.
 La batalla [The battle]. Buenos Aires: Editorial Losada, 1967.
 Apocalipsis XX [Revelation 20]. Caracas: Monte Avila, 1970.
 (ed. Roberto Ibáñez) Canto póstumo [Posthumous songs]. Buenos Aires: Editorial Losada, 1973.

References

Further reading
 
 

1909 births
1971 deaths
20th-century Uruguayan poets
Uruguayan women poets
Uruguayan essayists
Uruguayan women essayists
Uruguayan literary critics